LPMud, abbreviated LP, is a family of MUD server software.  Its first instance, the original LPMud game driver, was developed in 1989 by Lars Pensjö (hence the LP in LPMud).  LPMud was innovative in its separation of the MUD infrastructure into a virtual machine (known as the driver) and a development framework written in the LPC programming language (known as the mudlib).

Motivation
Pensjö had been an avid player of TinyMUD and AberMUD. He wanted to create a world with the flexibility of TinyMUD and the style of AberMUD.  Furthermore, he did not want to have sole responsibility for creating and maintaining the game world. He once said, "I didn't think I would be able to design a good adventure. By allowing wizards coding rights, I thought others could help me with this."  The result was the creation of a new, C-based, object-oriented programming language, LPC, that made it simple for people with minimal programming skills to add elements like rooms, weapons, and monsters to a virtual world.

To accomplish his goal, Lennart Augustsson convinced Pensjö to write what today would be called a virtual machine, the LPMud driver. The driver managed the interpretation of LPC code as well as providing basic operating system services to the LPC code. By virtue of this design, Pensjö made it more difficult for common programming errors like infinite loops and infinite recursion made by content builders to harm the overall stability of the server. His choice of an OO approach made it easy for new programmers to concentrate on the task of "building a room" rather than programming logic.

Evolution of LPMuds

Pensjö's interest in LPMuds eventually waned in the early 1990s, but by that time LPMud had become one of the most popular forms of MUD. His work has been extended or reverse engineered in a number of projects:
 LPMud 3.2, better known as the Amylaar driver, after its lead developer, Jörn "Amylaar" Rennecke
 MudOS
 DGD, Dworkin's Game Driver, a conceptual rather than code derivative of LPMud developed by Felix "Dworkin" Croes
 SWLPC, Shattered World's fork of LPMud 2.4.5

Though an LPMud server can be used to implement nearly any style of game, LPMuds are often thought of as having certain common characteristics as a genre, such as a mixture of hack and slash with role-playing, quests as an element of advancement, and "guilds" as an alternative to character classes.

LPMud talkers
LPMud was used as the basis for the first Internet talker, Cat Chat, which opened in 1990.

TMI Mudlib
The TMI Mudlib from The Mud Institute was an attempt to create a framework driven mudlib for the MudOS LPMud driver. It consisted of many contributors to MudOS as well as people who became influential in the LPMud community. When TMI began work in 1992, a mudlib was generally packaged with both an LPMud driver and a complete world built on top of the mudlib. As a framework-driven mudlib, the goal of the TMI mudlib was to provide only examples for world objects and place the burden of building a working world on the game developers using TMI.

TMI implemented the first InterMUD communications network, when MudOS added network socket support in 1992.

TMI never realized its vision and shut down. It was quickly followed, however, by TMI-2. Unlike TMI, TMI-2 was somewhat independent of the driver team. It leveraged elements of the original TMI mudlib and eventually released a somewhat workable product. Though it never achieved the success of its sibling the Nightmare Mudlib (also based on the original TMI mudlib), it did influence many developers, and the lessons learned with TMI-2 led to the successes of the Lima Mudlib.

In 1992, MIRE, a multi-user information system producing customised newspapers was built based on a modified TMI driver.

In 1993, the TMI-2 mudlib was used to create PangaeaMud, an academic research project designed as an interactive geologic database tool.

Though Lima took lessons from TMI-2, Lima is a completely independent codebase.

TMI-2 is still available, and often used as a learning tool, but not typically used today for new LPMud development.

Notable MUDs based on TMI-derived mudlibs include The Two Towers set in Tolkien’s universe and Threshold.

Server software 

MudOS is a major family of LPMud server software, implementing its own variant of the LPC (programming language).  It first came into being on February 18, 1992.  It pioneered important technical innovations in MUDs, including the network socket support that made InterMUD communications possible and LPC-to-C compilation.  Its name reflects its focus on separation of concerns between game driver and mudlib.

Genocide was an important development testbed for MudOS from 1992 to 1994, but switched back to the main LPMud branch, citing speed concerns.

FluffOS 

FluffOS is originally forked by Wodan from Discworld MUD, released as a roll-up patch to support Discworld MUD. Wodan continues to maintain FluffOS up to version 2.27, and has since FluffOS been maintained by Yucong Sun. FluffOS right now has release version 2017 and version 2019 in development. The FluffOS codebase contains source release of MudOS all the way up to mudos-0.8.14, and has largely maintained backward compatibility for LPMUD code written for MudOS v22, with many more modern features.

FluffOS v2019 uses c++ 17, has a modern cmake build system, and able to compile and run on latest Ubuntu and Mac OS X;Native windows support is still under development.

FluffOS is already being deployed in production with a lot of Chinese LPMUDs, with an active community.

See also
 Chronology of MUDs

References

Further reading

External links
 LPMud FAQ
 LPMud Timeline
 LDMud Website
 LPMuds.net - A resource for MUDs that use LPC.
 MUDseek - A Google custom search engine for MUDs.
 The LPmuds.net downloads page has a driver-bundled version of TMI-2 that's "easy-ish" to install.
 

1989 video games
MUD servers
Freeware games